Mel Mason (birth unknown) is an English former professional rugby league footballer who played in the 1970s and 1980s. He played at representative level for Cumbria, and at club level for Featherstone Rovers (Heritage № 500), Leeds, Barrow and Whitehaven, as an occasional goal-kicking , i.e. number 6.

Playing career

County honours
Mel Mason won cap(s) for Cumbria while at Barrow.

Premiership Final appearances
Mel Mason played, and was man of the match winning the Harry Sunderland Trophy in Leeds' 26-11 victory over St. Helens in the Premiership Final during the 1974–75 season at Central Park, Wigan on Saturday 17 May 1975.

Challenge Cup Final appearances
Mel Mason played  in Featherstone Rovers' 33-14 victory over Bradford Northern in the 1973 Challenge Cup Final during the 1972–73 season at Wembley Stadium, London on Saturday 12 May 1973, in front of a crowd of 72,395.

John Player Trophy Final appearances
Mel Mason played in Barrow's 5-12 defeat by Warrington in the 1980–81 John Player Trophy Final during the 1980–81 season at Central Park, Wigan on Saturday 24 January 1981.

Club career
Mel Mason was made his début for Featherstone Rovers in the defeat by Leeds during the 1970–71 season at Headingley Rugby Stadium, Leeds on Monday 5 October 1970, he was signed by Leeds for fee of £6,000 during January 1975, (based on increases in average earnings, this would be approximately £67,068 in 2015) injuries limited his appearances at Leeds, and he was transferred to Barrow in 1977 where he represented Cumbria, he finished his playing career at Whitehaven, he appears to have scored no drop-goals (or field-goals as they are currently known in Australasia), but prior to the 1974–75 season all goals, whether; conversions, penalties, or drop-goals, scored 2-points, consequently prior to this date drop-goals were often not explicitly documented, therefore '0' drop-goals may indicate drop-goals not recorded, rather than no drop-goals scored.

References

External links
(archived by archive.is) One Hull of a TV drama
(archived by web.archive.org) Back on the Wembley trail

Living people
Barrow Raiders players
Cumbria rugby league team players
English rugby league players
Featherstone Rovers players
Leeds Rhinos players
Place of birth missing (living people)
Rugby league five-eighths
Whitehaven R.L.F.C. players
Year of birth missing (living people)